Tom Menting (born 29 November 1994) is a Dutch professional footballer who plays as a midfielder for FC Lienden.

References

External links
 
 

1994 births
Living people
Association football midfielders
Dutch footballers
De Graafschap players
SV Spakenburg players
FC Lienden players
Eredivisie players
Tweede Divisie players
Derde Divisie players
People from Wageningen
Footballers from Gelderland